The 1999 European Women Basketball Championship, commonly called EuroBasket Women 1999, was the 27th regional championship held by FIBA Europe. The competition was held in Poland and took place from May 28 to June 6, 1999. Host Poland won the gold medal and France the silver medal while Russia won the bronze.

Squads

Preliminary round

Group A

Group B

Knockout stage

Championship bracket

5th place bracket

9th place bracket

Final standings

References 
 EuroBasket 1999; fibaeurope.com
 Women Basketball European Championship 1999; todor66.com

External links
 FIBA Archive

 
1999
1999 in Polish women's sport
International women's basketball competitions hosted by Poland
May 1999 sports events in Europe
June 1999 sports events in Europe
Euro